Levchuk or Lewchuk is a surname of Ukrainian origin. Notable people with the surname include:

Vyacheslav Levchuk (born 1971), Belarusian football coach and former player
Margarita Levchuk (born 1990), Belarusian opera singer

Surnames of Ukrainian origin